Patrick Langley is a British novelist. His debut novel Arkady was published by Fitzcarraldo Editions in 2018. It was longlisted for the RSL Ondaatje Prize and the Deborah Rogers Foundation Writers Award and was reviewed in The Guardian, The Irish Times, New Statesman, and elsewhere.

References

21st-century British novelists
Living people
Year of birth missing (living people)
Place of birth missing (living people)